Mary Azrael (born December 20, 1943) is an American author and poet. Her poems have appeared in journals including Prairie Schooner, Harpers, and Calyx. She is the co-founder of Passager Books and an editor of national literary journal, Passager, which features the work of older writers.

Publications
Azrael, Mary. Victorians. Red Dust, 1981. .
Azrael, Mary. Riddles for a Naked Sailor. Stonevale Press, 1991. .
Azrael, Mary; Kopelke, Kendra. Keeping Time: 150 Years of Journal Writing. Passager Books, 2009. .
Azrael, Mary; Kopelke, Kendra. Burning Bright: Passager Celebrates 21 Years. Passager Books, 2011. .
Azrael, Mary. The House No House. DogBone, 2017. .

References

1943 births
Living people
20th-century American writers
21st-century American writers
20th-century American women writers
21st-century American women writers